Vladimír Kolář (2 July 1927 – 25 October 2012) was a Czech speed skater. He competed at the 1948 Winter Olympics and the 1956 Winter Olympics.

References

External links
 

1927 births
2012 deaths
Czech male speed skaters
Olympic speed skaters of Czechoslovakia
Speed skaters at the 1948 Winter Olympics
Speed skaters at the 1956 Winter Olympics
Place of birth missing